The IIHF World Women's Championship, officially the IIHF Ice Hockey Women's World Championship, is the premier international tournament in women's ice hockey. It is governed by the International Ice Hockey Federation (IIHF).

The official world competition was first held in 1990, with four more championships held in the 90s. From 1989 to 1996, and in years that there was no world tournament held, there were European Championships and in 1995 and 1996 a Pacific Rim Championship. From the first Olympic Women's Ice Hockey Tournament in 1998 onward, the Olympic tournament was played instead of the IIHF Championships. Afterwards, the IIHF decided to hold Women's Championships in Olympic years, starting in 2014, but not at the top level. In September 2021, it was announced that the top division will also play during Olympic years.

Canada and the United States have dominated the Championship since its inception. Canada won gold at the first eight consecutive tournaments and the United States has won gold at nine of the last eleven tournaments. Both national teams placed either first or second every tournament until Canada's streak was broken at the 2019 Championship. Finland is the third most successful World Championship team, having won thirteen bronze medals and one silver medal – achieved after breaking the Canadian gold-silver streak. Four other teams have medalled at a Women's World Championship: Russia, winning three bronze medals; Sweden, winning two; and Switzerland and Czechia, each winning one.

Structure and qualification
The women's tournament began as an eight-team tournament featuring Canada, the US, the top five from the 1989 European Championships, and one Asian qualifier. The same formula was used for 1992, 1994, and 1997, but changed following the first Olympic women's ice hockey tournament at the 1998 Nagano Olympics. The top five teams from the Olympic tournament qualified for the 1999 World Championship, followed by the best three from final Olympic qualification rounds. Beginning in 1999, the championship became an annual tournament and the first divisional tournaments below the Top Division were played. Along with the creation of the lower divisions, a system of promotion and relegation was introduced, allowing for movement between all divisions.

After the 2017 tournament, it was announced that tournament would expand to 10 teams for 2019, having been played with 8 teams since the first tournament in 1990, except in 2004, 2007, 2008, and 2009, where 9 teams played. The 2004 edition featured 9 teams when Japan was promoted from Division II but no team was relegated from the Top Division in 2003, due to the cancellation of the top division tournament in China because of the outbreak of the SARS disease. Two teams were relegated from the Top Division in 2004, going back to 8 teams for 2005, but due to the success of the 9-team pool in 2004, IIHF decided to expand again to 9 teams for 2007. IIHF reverted to 8 teams after the 2009 tournament, and play continued in this format until the expansion of 2019.

Championship format
Initially, the tournament was an eight-team tournament divided into two groups, which played round-robin.  The top two from each group played off for the gold, and beginning in 1999 the bottom two played off to determine placement and relegation. In 2004, 2007, 2008, and 2009 the tournament was played with nine nations, using three groups of three playing round-robin.  In this format first place from each group continued on to play for gold, second place from each group played for placement and an opportunity to still play for bronze, and the third place teams played off to determine relegation. Beginning in 2011, the tournament changed the format to encourage more equal games. The top four seed nations played in Group A, where the top two teams got a bye to the semifinals, the bottom two go to the quarter-finals to face the top two finishers from Group B.  The bottom two from Group B then play each other in a best of three to determine relegation. Beginning in 2019 the tournament was expanded to ten teams, bringing with it a new format. The ten teams are divided into two groups of five and play round-robin. In this format, the five teams in Group A and the top three teams from Group B move into the Quarterfinals, seeded A1vsB3, A2vsB2, A3vsB1, and A4vsA5. The bottom two from Group B now play only one 9th place game and both get relegated. As of 2021, the four teams that lose their quarterfinal games enter into a knockout tournament to determine 5th place with the winner earning a spot in Group A for the next tournament.

Lower divisions
Outside of the Top Division tournament, participating nations play in groups of no more than six teams. , there are six group tiers across three divisions below the Top Division.

Introduced in 1999 as a Division I tournament and Division I qualification tournament, the number of lower divisions rapidly expanded as more national teams gained admittance. By 2003 the lower tiers were formalized into tiered groups of six teams each, called Division I, Division II, and Division III, with promotion for the top team in each and relegation for the bottom team. By 2009 it had grown up to Division V, but in 2012 the titles were changed to match the men's tournaments; Division I became IA, Division II became IB, Division III became IIA, Division IV became IIB, and Division V became IIB Qualification. Promotion and relegation remained the same after the title changes.

Rules and eligibility

The rules of play are essentially the same as used for the men's tournaments, with one key difference: body checking is not permitted in the women's tournaments. Body checking was allowed at the first championship in 1990 but has been assessed as a minor penalty at all subsequent tournaments. 

In order to be eligible to compete in IIHF events, players must be under the jurisdiction of the governing body they are representing and must be a citizen of that country. Additionally, the player must be eighteen years old, or sixteen with a medical waiver, in the season the tournament takes place.

Tournaments

Participation and medals

Awards

At most IIHF events, the tournament directorate awards the Best Forward, Best Defenceman, Best Goalkeeper and Most Valuable Player (MVP). At the Women's World Championship, these honours have been awarded in some combination since the first tournament, with the exception of 1997 and the cancelled tournaments in 2003 and 2020.

Lower division tournaments

Notes:
  Tournament cancelled due to COVID-19 pandemic

See also
 4 Nations Cup
 Ice hockey at the Olympic Games
 Canada–United States women's national ice hockey rivalry

References

Works cited

External links 

Women's Hockey Web
Women's World Championships at EuroHockey.com
Championnats du monde féminins at HockeyArchives.info 

 
International Ice Hockey Federation tournaments
Recurring sporting events established in 1990
Women's ice hockey tournaments
Women's
de:Eishockey-Weltmeisterschaft#A-WM der Frauen